Gonzálo Guízar Valladares (born 27 April 1961) is a Mexican politician affiliated with the National Action Party (formerly to the Institutional Revolutionary Party). As of 2014 he served as Deputy of the LIX Legislature of the Mexican Congress representing Veracruz.

References

1961 births
Living people
People from Coatzacoalcos
Institutional Revolutionary Party politicians
National Action Party (Mexico) politicians
Politicians from Veracruz
Universidad Veracruzana alumni
21st-century Mexican politicians
Deputies of the LIX Legislature of Mexico
Members of the Chamber of Deputies (Mexico) for Veracruz